WQBN (1300 AM) is a radio station broadcasting a Spanish Variety format. Licensed to Temple Terrace, Florida, United States, it serves the Tampa Bay area. The station is currently owned by Crisbeto Enterprises Corp. It is the former home for Tampa Bay Devil Rays baseball in Spanish.

FM Translator
WQBN programming is simulcast on an FM translator to improve coverage, especially during the hours between sunset and sunrise when the AM station broadcasts with only 16 watts.  The translator also provides high fidelity sound, inherent on FM.

External links

http://www.q1300.com

QBN